The 91st Regiment of Foot had a brief existence as a British Army infantry regiment between 1759 and 1763. It was raised in Ireland, posted in turn to the West Indies and the Iberian Peninsula and finally disbanded in 1763. Some of the personnel then transferred to the 3rd Regiment of Foot, then stationed in Menorca. The Regimental Colonel throughout its life was Lt-Gen. Cadwallader Blayney, 9th Baron Blayney who had fought at the Battle of Minden in August 1759.

References

Infantry regiments of the British Army
Military units and formations established in 1759
Military units and formations disestablished in 1763